Between the Spirit & the Flesh is fourth studio album of American singer, Ari Gold. This is the first album released under the moniker "Sir Ari".

Track listing
Flesh & Blood 
Make My Body Rock 
Play My F**kn Record 
My Favorite Religion 
Over The Internet 
Out Dancing (featuring Adam Joseph)
Stay in This 
Sparkle (featuring Sarah Dash) 
If I Steal Your Boyfriend (featuring Mila Jam and Peppermint)
New York Attitude 
Epilogue: Spirit Technology

Personnel
 Producer: Ari Gold, Sarah Dash, Michael Colin, Steven Gold, Kazuhiko Gomi, Yaron Fuchs, Brandin Pope, Ido Zmishlany
 Video Director: Colly Carver, Aaron Cobbett, Duane Cramer, Karl Giant, Christopher Ciccone, Amir Jaffer, Joe Phillips, Lex Wolfcraft
 Remixing: Scott Anderson, Daniel Bagley, Massimo Esposito, Dr. Brooks, Jared Jones, Tim Letteer, Jonathan Mendelsohn, Matt Moss, Rasjek
 Mastering: Yaron Fuchs
 Mixing: Yaron Fuchs
 Vocals: Ari Gold, Sarah Dash, Mila Jam, Adam Joseph, Kelly King, Peppermint, Ido Zmishlany
 Make-Up: Josh Galarza
 Hair Stylist: Roberto Novo
 Photography: Jason Duran, André Robert Lee, Gustavo Monroy, Edwin Pabon
 Art Direction: Christopher Kornmann
 Design: Christopher Kornmann
 Web Design: Allison Borowick, Bob Paterson
 Programming: Steve Skinner
 Engineer: Ido Zmishlany
 Choreographer: Janelle Dote, Caitlin Grey, Nick Kenkel
 Instruments: Kazuhiko Gomi (String Arrangements), T.M. Stevens (Bass), Steve Skinner (Keyboard, Keyboard Arrangements)

References

2011 albums
Ari Gold (musician) albums